Petauridae is a family of possums containing 11 species: four species of trioks and striped possum (genus Dactylopsila), six species of wrist-winged glider (genus Petaurus), and Leadbeater's possum (Gymnobelideus leadbeateri), which has only vestigial gliding membranes. Most of the wrist-winged gliders are native to Australia, whereas most of the striped possums to New Guinea, but some members of each group are found on both sides of the Torres Strait. Leadbeater's possum is endemic to Victoria, Australia.

Evolution 
All petaurids have obvious facial markings, a well-defined dorsal stripe, very large lower front incisors, and four-cusped molars. Despite their distinctive appearance, petaurids are closely related to the ringtail possums (family Pseudocheiridae) and are grouped together with them to form the superfamily Petauroidea.

The wrist-winged gliders are omnivorous, specialising on sap and nectar, but taking a wide variety of supplemental foods. The gliders appears to have evolved in the open forests of Australia—gliding membranes are an adaptation which aids mobility when the forest canopy is incomplete, and are of little use in rainforests— but now has representatives in New Guinea and many of the smaller islands nearby. Their similarities to the unrelated flying squirrels are an example of convergent evolution.

The striped possums, on the other hand, are thought to have evolved on New Guinea; the sole Australian species (the striped possum of Cape York) is considered a recent immigrant. All members of this genus are insectivores, and have specialised structures for catching insects: a heel-like structure on the wrist that is thought to be used to tap on wood to locate insect larvae, and an elongated fourth finger to extract them from their burrows.

Taxonomy 
The listing for extant species is based on The Third edition of Wilson & Reeder's Mammal Species of the World (2005), except where the Mammal Diversity Database and IUCN agree on a change. The family consists of the following three genera and 11 species:

 Genus Dactylopsila
 Great-tailed triok, Dactylopsila megalura
 Long-fingered triok, Dactylopsila palpator
 Tate's triok, Dactylopsila tatei
 Striped possum, Dactylopsila trivirgata

 Genus Gymnobelideus
 Leadbeater's possum, Gymnobelideus leadbeateri

 Genus Petaurus
 Northern glider, Petaurus abidi
 Yellow-bellied glider, Petaurus australis
 Biak glider, Petaurus biacensis
 Sugar glider, Petaurus breviceps
 Mahogany glider, Petaurus gracilis
 Squirrel glider, Petaurus norfolcensis

References

Further reading

External links 
 
 

Possums
Mammal families
Taxa named by Charles Lucien Bonaparte